William Sutherland (24 August 1859 – 5 October 1911) was a Scottish-born Australian theoretical physicist, physical chemist and writer for The Age (Melbourne) newspaper.

Early life and education
Sutherland was born in Glasgow, Scotland, son of George Sutherland, a woodcarver, 
and his wife Jane, née Smith. William had siblings Alexander Sutherland, George Sutherland and Jane Sutherland. The family emigrated to Australia in 1864, staying in Sydney for six years and then moving to Melbourne in 1870. Sutherland later graduated from Wesley College. The headmaster was Martin Howy Irving who had been the second professor of classics at the University of Melbourne, but the influence of the second master, H. M. Andrew, afterwards professor of natural philosophy at the same university, was of more importance to Sutherland. From Wesley Sutherland enrolled at the University of Melbourne in February 1876, graduating B.A. in 1879 with first-class final honours and the scholarship in natural science, and third-class honours in engineering.

Sutherland was then nominated by the Melbourne University council for the Gilchrist scholarship at University College, London, in England, which was awarded to him and he left for England in July 1879. Entering as a science student at University College London, Sutherland came under the influence of Professor Carey Foster, and in the final examination for the BSc degree took first place and first class honours in experimental physics and the clothworkers scholarship of £50 for two years. Sutherland had not enjoyed his time in England and arrived back in Melbourne in February 1882.

Career
Sutherland's home life meant a lot to him, it was a home of affection and culture, every member of it excelled in either literature, music or art. In July 1882 Sutherland was offered the position of superintendent of the School of Mines, Ballarat, but it was too far from his home and the public library, and the offer was declined. For many years he earned just enough to pay his way by acting as an examiner and contributing articles to the press; the rest of his time was given to scientific research. In 1884 he applied without success for the chair of chemistry at the University of Adelaide, and in 1888 when the professor of natural philosophy Henry Martyn Andrew died Sutherland was appointed lecturer at the University of Melbourne until the chair could be filled. Sutherland had applied for this position through the Victorian agent-general in London, but the application was reportedly mis-filed and was not considered. Professor Thomas Ranken Lyle was appointed and in 1897, when he was away on leave, Sutherland was again made lecturer. Sutherland had begun contributing to the Philosophical Magazine in 1885, and on an average about two articles a year front his pen appeared in it for the next 25 years. For the last 10 years of his life he was a regular contributor and leader writer on the Melbourne Age, particularly on scientific subjects. Sutherland declined an offer of an appointment on the staff of the paper. Sutherland wrote on such topics as the surface tension of liquids, diffusion, the rigidity of solids, the properties of solutions (including an influential analysis of the structure of water), the origin of spectra and the source of the Earth's magnetic field. Sutherland devoted most of his time to scientific research. A list of 69 of his contributions to scientific magazines appears in W. A. Osborne's, William Sutherland a Biography. Sutherland died quietly in his sleep on 5 October 1911 from a ruptured heart.

Legacy
Sutherland was a well-built man of slightly under medium height, very quiet in manner. He could have been a good musician or a painter if he had been able to give the time. One of the earlier papers to bring Sutherland into notice was on the viscosity of gases which appeared in the Philosophical Magazine in December 1893. Other important papers dealt with the constitution of water, the viscosity of water, molecular attractions and ionization, ionic velocities and atomic sizes. The ordinary reader may refer to a discussion of his scientific work in chapter VI of Osborne's biography of Sutherland, but the full value of it could only be computed by a physicist willing to collate his papers with the state of knowledge at the time each was written. It was well known and valued in England, Germany and America. Professor T. R. Lyle said at the time of Sutherland's death that he was "the greatest authority living in molecular physics". Modest and selfless, Sutherland was content to add to the sum of human knowledge and to hope that another person would carry the work further. Sutherland never married.

Sutherland wrote an equation describing Brownian motion and diffusion which was published in a 1904 paper, which he presented at a Dunedin ANZAAS conference. Albert Einstein's first published work on the same topic was published in 1905.

References

Further reading
 Essay on William Sutherland by Prof. Roderick Weir Home 2005

External links
http://williamsutherland.wordpress.com/
Sutherland potential equation and description at SklogWiki.org

1859 births
1911 deaths
Scientists from Glasgow
Australian physicists
University of Melbourne alumni
People educated at Wesley College (Victoria)
Scottish emigrants to colonial Australia
Writers from Melbourne
Scientists from Melbourne